St Andrew's Church is a Church of England parish church in the Essex village of Marks Tey. It was Grade I listed in 1965.

Its nave was built around 1100, using coursed walls of mixed rubble, puddingstone and Roman bricks, possibly from an undiscovered villa in the area. Its chancel was rebuilt around 1330, with a sedilla, a piscina, a mid or late 14th century chancel arch and a blocked-up doorway to a former rood screen.

The current west tower and small spire are 16th century but may represent a rebuild of one from the later 14th century. Its base is of brick and rubble and the upper two-thirds of timber. The south porch is also 16th century, whilst the font cover is early 17th century. The whole building was restored in the 19th century.

References 

Church of England church buildings in the Borough of Colchester
Grade I listed churches in Essex
English churches with Norman architecture
12th-century church buildings in England